Office of Chief Medical Examiner of the City of New York
Oklahoma Office of the Chief Medical Examiner

See also
Chief Medical Examiner